Gandom Ban Habib Vand (also Romanized as Gandom Bān Ḩabīb Vand; also known as Jībvand-e Gandom Bān, Gandom Bān, Gandoom Ban, and Ḩabībvand) is a village in Khaveh-ye Jonubi Rural District, in the Central District of Delfan County, Lorestan Province, Iran. At the 2006 census, its population was 302, in 69 families.

References 

Towns and villages in Delfan County